A number of organizations, museums, and monuments are intended to serve as memorials to the Armenian genocide and its over 1 million victims.

Turkey has campaigned against the establishment of such memorials. In 1983, Israeli diplomat  reported that he was told by a representative of the Turkish Foreign Ministry that "Turkey will not accept the establishment of an Armenian Memorial in Israel. Establishing such a monument would jeopardize the relations between the two countries and might push them to the point of no return."

List
The following table shows the major memorials around the world dedicated to the memory of the Armenian genocide victims. 

 A memorial khatchkar at the Armenian Catholic Patriarchate in Bzoummar, Lebanon (1960)
 The Armenian Genocide Monument in Buenos Aires, Argentina (1985)
 Relief at the Armenian Catholic Patriarchate in Bzoummar, Lebanon (1993)
 The Armenian Monument in De Boskamp cemetery, Assen, Netherlands (24 April 2001)
 The memorial monument in Rome, Italy (2006)
 The Wales Genocide Memorial in Cardiff, Wales, (2007)
 The memorial monument in Mislata, Valencia, Spain (2010)
 The Memorial monument at the Saint Abgar Church, Scottsdale, Arizona (2011)
 Armenian Genocide Memorial Square in Los Angeles, not yet finished
Armenian Genocide Museum of America, not yet opened
 The memorial monument in Petržalka, Bratislava, Slovakia (2011)
 The memorial monument in Košice, Slovakia (2016)
 Mémorial du génocide arménien de Décines-Charpieuat, Rue du 24 Avril 1915 in Décines-Charpieu, France
 Armenian Genocide Memorial, Paul Mistral Park, Grenoble, France
 Memorial, Rue du Génocide Arménien, Chasse-sur-Rhône, Auvergne-Rhône-Alpes, France
 Armenians, Greeks and Assyrians Genocide monument, Memorial park, Berlin, Germany
 Armenian Genocide Memorial, Nairyan Street, Seven, Armenia
 Cross stone memorial monument in Nîmes, France (2022)

Gallery

See also 
 Armenian genocide in culture

References

External links 

 Armenian National Institute: Memorials to the Armenian Genocide

 Memorials
Genocide Memorials
Genocide Memorials
Lists of monuments and memorials by subject
genocide memorials
genocide memorials